Celeribacter neptunius is a Gram-negative, aerobic and motile bacterium from the genus of Celeribacter which has been isolated from seawater from the Tasman Sea in Australia.

References

Rhodobacteraceae
Bacteria described in 2010